AMA Studio (formerly Allan Murray Architects) is an Edinburgh, Scotland based practice of award-winning Architects and Urbanists.

In recent years the modern nature of some of its designs has attracted criticism since it is not perceived to "fit" with Edinburgh's current architecture.   Some commentators, including Magnus Linklater have even questioned whether too many buildings in Edinburgh have been designed by the firm.

In 2010 the Hotel Missoni in Edinburgh (now the Radisson Collection Hotel, Royal Mile Edinburgh) designed by the firm was awarded a Special Award for Scotland by the Civic Trust Awards. Hotel Missoni also won an RIBA Award in 2010.

In April 2020, the company became an employee owned trust.

Awards
British Construction Industry Awards 
 2003 Winner - Small Projects Category, Cowgate under 5's Centre, Edinburgh

Britannia HomeBuilder Design Awards
 2002 Winner - Best Apartment Building, Coalhill Urban Development, Leith, Edinburgh

British Council for Offices Awards
 2003 Winner - Best Commercial Workplace Regional Award, The Tun, Holyrood, Edinburgh
 2003 Winner - Best Commercial Workplace National Award, The Tun, Holyrood, Edinburgh

EAA Silver Medal
 2000 Commendation - Best Building, UDV Guinness HQ, Edinburgh Park
 2002 Winner, Cowgate under 5's Centre, Edinburgh

Prime Minister's Better Public Buildings Award
 2003 Shortlisted, Cowgate under 5's Centre, Edinburgh

Royal Scottish Academy Gold Medal for Architecture 
 1998 Winner, Hamilton Arts Centre and Library

Scottish Architectural Awards 
 1996 Winner - Best Building, Peterhead Maritime Heritage Museum

Scottish Design Awards 
 2001 Winner - Best Commercial Building, UDV Guinness HQ, Edinburgh Park
2003 Commendation – Best Commercial Project, Site A Masterplan, Edinburgh Park

Scottish Property Awards
2003 Winner - Commercial Development of the Year, Calton Square, Edinburgh

References

External links
Practice website. Retrieved 11 January 2008.

Architecture firms of Scotland
Companies based in Edinburgh
1992 establishments in Scotland
Design companies established in 1992